Christopher James Calhoun Tynan (born July 11, 1966) is a Canadian former rugby union player who played as scrum-half.

Career
Tynan played rugby union for Meraloma at club level. He debuted for Canada on 14 November 1987, against United States, in Victoria. He was also called up in the Canada 1991 Rugby World Cup squad, where he played three matches in the tournament. Tynan also played in The Varsity Match for Cambridge, which he won in 1993. Although not being anymore called up in the Canada squad in the 1995 Rugby World Cup, Tynan still played for Canada until his last test cap on 6 June 1998, against United States, in Burlington.

References

External links

1966 births
Living people
Canadian expatriate sportspeople in England
Canadian rugby union players
Sportspeople from Vancouver
Canada international rugby union players
University of British Columbia alumni
Rugby union scrum-halves